New Tales from the Mountain is a short story collection written by the Portuguese writer Miguel Torga and published in 1944.

References 

1944 short story collections
Portuguese short story collections